The 38th European Athletics Indoor Championships will be held from 6 to 9 March 2025 at the Omnisport Apeldoorn arena in Apeldoorn, Netherlands. The multi-use, multi-sport venue can hold a maximum capacity of 5,000 spectators. It will be the third time that the Netherlands will have staged the continent's top indoor competition after Rotterdam 1973 and The Hague 1989. It will be also the third time in a decade that the country will host major European Athletics event after the outdoor Amsterdam 2016 European Athletics Championships and Tilburg 2018 European Cross Country Championships. The four-day competition will feature 13 men's and 13 women's athletics events over three morning and four afternoon sessions.

On 6 May 2022, the European Athletic Association (EAA) chose Apeldoorn at its 164th Council Meeting held in Munich. The organization of the event is a partnership of local athletics clubs, the municipality of Apeldoorn, the Province of Gelderland, TIG Sports and the Royal Dutch Athletics Federation (Atletiekunie).

References

External links

 Official website

European Athletics Indoor Championships
European Athletics Indoor Championships
Sports competitions in Apeldoorn